Cuttaburra is a rural locality in the Shire of Paroo, Queensland, Australia.

Geography 
Cuttaburra Creek is a tributary of the Warrego River, joining it south of Cunnamulla. The creek forms the north-east boundary of the locality.

The southern boundary of the locality is the border of Queensland with New South Wales (latitude 29 South).

The Binya National Park is located within the locality on the south-western boundary.

In 1916, geologist and palaeontologist Robert Etheridge described the area as having "shifting" sand hills and claypans. The shifting sand hills were of colours that varied by colour from a yellowish tint to a deep brick red and were up to 50 feet in height. He observed that the wind drove these shifting sand hills along over time. He said that the claypans were:"shallow depressions, more or less oval or circular in outline, large or small, distributed throughout the red soil country, treeless, often bearing a copious growth of grass, particularly cane grass and various kinds of salt-bush. These pans are water-bearing in wet seasons, but otherwise dry, and in flood time many of them, no doubt, communicate with one another. Of this nature appears to be the Cuttaburra branch of the Paroo River, an indescribable flat and weird surface of great extent."

History 
The Cuttaburra Creek is shown on an 1872 map of Queensland. The locality name is believed to derive from the creek name and is thought to be an Aboriginal word. In some New South Wales Aboriginal languages the word burra means hill ants.

Cuttaburra Provisional School opened in 1899 and closed circa 1906.

References

External links 

Shire of Paroo
Localities in Queensland